The Norwegian Board of Health Supervision (short name Helsetilsynet) is a national government institution under the Norwegian Ministry of Health and Care Services.

The Norwegian Board of Health Supervision is an independent supervision authority, with responsibility for general supervision of child protection, health and social services in the country. The Norwegian Board of Health Supervision directs the supervision authorities at the county level: the Offices of the County Governors.

References

External links
Norwegian Board of Health Supervision - Official webpage

Medical and health organisations based in Norway
Health Supervision